Atlantocis is a genus of tree-fungus beetle in the family Ciidae.

Species
 Atlantocis canariensis Israelson, 1985
 Atlantocis gillerforsi Israelson, 1985
 Atlantocis lauri Wollaston, 1854

References

Ciidae genera